Events in the year 2020 in Eswatini.

Incumbents 

 Monarch (Ngwenyama): Mswati III
 Prime Minister: Ambrose Mandvulo Dlamini (until 13 December)Themba N. Masuku (since 13 December)

Events 

 14 March – The country's first case of COVID-19 was confirmed. A 33-year-old woman, who returned from the United States at the end of February and then travelled to Lesotho before returning home to Eswatini, entered isolation.

Deaths

December
13 December: Ambrose Mandvulo Dlamini, Prime Minister since 2018 dies from COVID-19 at the age of 52.

References 

 
2020s in Eswatini
Years of the 21st century in Eswatini
Eswatini
Eswatini